The following lists events that happened during 1969 in the Democratic Republic of the Congo.

Incumbents 
 President: Mobutu Sese Seko

Events

General

Minière des Grands Lacs Africains (MGL) is merged with Kivumines, Phibraki and Cobelmin, based in Kamituga.

References

Sources

 
Democratic Republic of the Congo
Democratic Republic of the Congo